Elihu Hubbard Smith (September 4, 1771 – September 19, 1798) was an American author, physician, and man of letters.

Early life and education 
Smith was born in Litchfield, Connecticut, to Dr. Reuben Smith and Abigail Hubbard Smith. He entered Yale College at the age of 11 and received his Bachelor of Arts degree in 1786, making him Yale's youngest graduate at the time. He studied another year with Timothy Dwight at the academy at Greenfield Hill in Fairfield and went on to attend lectures at the Medical College of Philadelphia in 1790. He never received a medical degree but returned to Connecticut in late 1791 and attempted to establish a medical practice in Wethersfield, albeit with little success. He became a practicing physician in New York City in 1793, joined New York Hospital in 1796, and published articles on plagues and pestilential fevers in ancient Athens and Syracuse.

Literary career 
Smith wrote the first American comic opera, Edwin and Angelina; or, The Banditti (1796), a musical dramatization of Oliver Goldsmith's romantic ballad “The Hermit.” He was editor of the first book-length anthology of American poetry (American Poems, Selected and Original, 1793) and the first national American medical journal (The Medical Repository, launched in 1796–97). Smith was the youngest member of the Connecticut Wits, and alongside Richard Alsop, Mason Cogswell, Theodore Dwight, and Lemuel Hopkins, he contributed to The Echo, a series of satiric poems with a Federalist slant. From 1795 until his death, he kept a diary totaling some half-million words.

In New York, Smith was a member and trustee of the anti-slavery Manumission Society, which ran a school for the children of slaves. His home became the headquarters of the Friendly Club, a New York literary society of young Federalist intellectuals. He was a friend and correspondent of many leading intellectuals of the era, including Noah Webster, Alexander Hamilton, Benjamin Rush, Uriah Tracy, Samuel Latham Mitchill, Charles Brockden Brown, James Kent, and William Dunlap. Smith was a deist.

Death 
Smith contracted yellow fever while attending patients during an outbreak of the disease in New York. He died five days later at the home of his friend Horace Miller on September 19, 1798. He is buried in the cemetery of the First Presbyterian Church on Wall Street in Manhattan.

Smith's portrait, painted by James Sharples ca. 1797, is in the permanent collection of the New-York Historical Society.

References 

1771 births
1798 deaths
People from Litchfield, Connecticut
Hartford Wits
Poets from Connecticut
18th-century American poets
18th-century American male writers
American male poets
Physicians from Connecticut
Deaths from yellow fever
Yale College alumni
18th-century American dramatists and playwrights
American male dramatists and playwrights
18th-century American physicians